Hillevi (also Hellevi) is a Scandinavian version of the German name Helvig, originally Heilwig. The oldest record of a Swedish woman by the name Hillevi is from 1482.

Notable people named Hillevi
Hillevi Engström, Swedish politician and Minister for International Development Cooperation 
Hillevi Larsson, Swedish politician
Hillevi Martinpelto, Swedish opera singer
Hillevi Rombin, Swedish model and actress
Hillevi Svedberg, Swedish architect

References